Sreekovil is a 1962 Indian Malayalam-language film, directed by P. A. Thomas and S. Ramanathan and produced by N. Krishnan. The film stars Sathyan, Thikkurissy Sukumaran Nair, P. A. Thomas and Ambika in the lead roles. The film had musical score by V. Dakshinamoorthy.

Cast
Sathyan 
Thikkurissy Sukumaran Nair 
P. A. Thomas
Ambika 
Kanchana 
Kottarakkara Sreedharan Nair 
S. P. Pillai 
K. V. Shanthi

Soundtrack
The music was composed by V. Dakshinamoorthy and lyrics were written by Abhayadev.

References

External links
 

1962 films
1960s Malayalam-language films
Films directed by S. Ramanathan